The University of Quintana Roo (in Spanish: Universidad de Quintana Roo, UQROO) is a Mexican public university with several campuses across the state of Quintana Roo, in the Yucatán peninsula. It was created on 24 May 1991.

Its Division of Health Sciences was formally opened on October 23, 2010.

Its library system holds over 36,634 volumes.

References

University of Quintana Roo
Educational institutions established in 1991
1991 establishments in Mexico
University